Otto V may refer to:

 Otto V, Count of Orlamünde, father-in-law of Henry VII of Brzeg
 Otto V, Margrave of Brandenburg-Salzwedel (c. 1246 – 1298)
 Otto V, Duke of Bavaria (1346–1379)
 Otto V, Duke of Brunswick-Lüneburg (1439–1471)

See also
 Otto I (disambiguation)
 Otto II (disambiguation)
 Otto III (disambiguation)
 Otto IV (disambiguation)
 Otto VI
 Otto VII (disambiguation)
 Otto VIII (disambiguation)